Charles Ryan (December 19, 1915 – February 16, 2008) was an American singer and songwriter, best known for co-writing and first recording the rockabilly hit single "Hot Rod Lincoln".

Biography
Ryan grew up in Polson, Montana and moved to Spokane in 1943.  He served in the United States Army during The Korean War. After the war, he worked as a musician and songwriter, touring with artists such as Jim Reeves and Johnny Horton.  In 1955, he wrote "Hot Rod Lincoln", and Ryan recorded the first version of the song (as "Charley Ryan and The Livingston Brothers"). Ryan released a remake in 1959 as "Charlie Ryan and The Timberline Riders"; the song was later covered by Johnny Bond (1960) and Commander Cody and His Lost Planet Airmen (1972) (#7 Canada), among others.

Discography

Albums

Singles

References

External links
 Obituary, Los Angeles Times, February 22, 2008
 Charlie Ryan official website
 

1915 births
2008 deaths
People from Graceville, Minnesota
American country singer-songwriters
Four Star Records artists
King Records artists
United States Army personnel of the Korean War
20th-century American singers
Singer-songwriters from Minnesota
People from Polson, Montana